Macclesfield Football Club is an association football club based in Macclesfield, Cheshire, England. It is a phoenix club of the former Macclesfield Town F.C. founded in 1874, which was wound-up after a High Court ruling on 16 September 2020. The club began their first competitive season in the North West Counties Premier Division, the fifth step of the National League system, in August 2021, winning promotion to the Northern Premier League Division One West.

History 
Macclesfield F.C. is a successor to Macclesfield Town. Founded in 1874, Macclesfield Town was liquidated and expelled from the National League in 2020 because of debts of over £500,000. Its assets were put up for sale, including the Moss Rose stadium on the Rightmove property website. In October 2020, the stadium and all available assets were purchased by Robert Smethurst, the owner of Stockport Town, with the aim of returning professional football to Macclesfield by creating the phoenix club as Macclesfield F.C. Smethurst appointed the Welsh former professional footballer Robbie Savage as a member of the board for the new phoenix club with Danny Whitaker as manager. He also invested in upgrading the stadium to improve the commercial viability of the new club.

In May 2021, it was announced that Macclesfield would be placed in the NWCFL Premier Division for their first season. Savage announced that the club would be joining with his foundation to offer free tickets to foundation participants to encourage youth attendance at the club's matches. Macclesfield entered the FA Vase for the first time in 2021–22.

2021–22 season
On 31 July 2021 Macclesfield played their first competitive match, a 1–0 win at home against Burscough in the  NWCFL Premier Division played in front of a restricted capacity sell-out crowd of 2,018; Leon Arnasalam scored the only goal. The club's first away match was on 3 August, a 4–4 draw at Winsford United, also in the  NWCFL Premier Division, with Tom Clare scoring all four Macclesfield goals. On 7 August Macclesfield played their first FA Cup match, beating Burscough 4–0 in the Extra Preliminary Round, but were then knocked out of the FA Cup in the Preliminary Round losing 6–4 at Squires Gate.

On 30 August Macclesfield defeated local rivals Congleton Town 1–0 in the  NWCFL Premier Division in front of a record crowd of 3,502, James Berry-McNally scoring the only goal. The match was suspended for several minutes late in the second half due to crowd trouble. It was the first time the neighbouring towns had met in a league match since the 1964–65 season. 

On 11 September, Macclesfield played in the FA Vase for the first time, losing 3–2 at Northern Counties East League Premier Division side  Winterton Rangers in the first qualifying round.

Macclesfield F.C. was featured in a BBC Sport documentary film, Robbie Savage: Making Macclesfield FC, broadcast on 13 November 2021, which described the launch of the new club following the collapse of Macclesfield Town.

Despite a relatively poor run of form at the start of the new year (L2, D1, W2 in January), a run of ten consecutive wins followed, in which 37 goals were scored and only four conceded. On 12 March 2022, Macclesfield secured the North West Counties Premier Division title and promotion to the NPL Division One West after a 4–0 win against Ashton Athletic, becoming the first club in England's top nine tiers in 2022 to guarantee promotion. Macclesfield finished their league campaign on 2 April, 15 points clear of second-placed Skelmersdale United.

2022–23 season
In October 2022, with the club three points clear at the top of the NPL West Division, Danny Whitaker was replaced as Macclesfield manager by David McNabb. McNabb stepped down in December 2022, with midfielder Neil Danns being appointed interim manager.

Shirt sponsors and manufacturers

Players

Current squad

Out on loan

Management

Team management and coaching staff

Club management and staff

Managerial history

Seasons
As of 14 January 2023

Club honours

League
NWCFL Premier Division 
Champions: 2021–22

Club records

Attendance 
 Highest home attendance (Top 3): 
4,720 v AFC Liverpool, 2 April 2022 – NWCFL Premier Division
4,604 v Ashton Athletic, 12 March 2022 – NWCFL Premier Division
4,512 v Hanley Town, 26 December 2022 – NPL Division One West

 Lowest home attendance: 
402 v Cheadle Heath Nomads, 2 November 2021 – Cheshire Senior Cup First Round

 Highest away attendance (Top 3): 
2,024 v Leek Town, 16 August 2022 – NPL Division One West
1,680 v Congleton Town, 26 March 2022 – NWCFL Premier Division
1,340 v West Didsbury & Chorlton, 3 September 2022 – FA Cup First Qualifying Round

 Lowest away attendance:
181 v Northwich Victoria, 16 November 2022 – Cheshire Senior Cup First Round

Results 
 Biggest home win: 

 7–0 v Tadcaster Albion, 13 September 2022 - FA Trophy First Qualifying Round

 Heaviest home defeat: 
 1–3  v  Stockport County, 7 December 2021 – Cheshire Senior Cup Second Round
 2–4  v  Wythenshawe Town, 8 January 2022 – NWCFL Premier Division
 0–2  v Guiseley, 29 October 2022 – FA Trophy First Round
 Biggest away win: 
 0–6 v  Vauxhall Motors, 22 February 2022 – NWCFL Premier Division   
 Heaviest away defeat: 
 6–4 v Squires Gate, 21 August 2021 – FA Cup Preliminary Round
 4–2 v Longridge Town, 20 September 2021 – NWCFL Premier Division
 2–0 v Avro, 29 September 2021 – NWCFL Premier Division
 Highest scoring draw: 
 4–4 v Winsford United (A), 3 August 2021 – NWCFL Premier Division
 Highest aggregate score: 
 (10) 6–4 v Squires Gate (A), 21 August 2021 – FA Cup Preliminary Round

Streaks 
 Longest unbeaten run (All comps): 
 17 matches, from 14 January 2022 to 2 May 2022
 Longest unbeaten run (League): 
 18 matches, from 14 January 2022 to 6 September 2022
 Longest unbeaten run (Home - All comps): 
 14 matches, from 31 July 2021 to 7 December 2021
 Longest unbeaten run (Home - League): 
 13 matches, from 31 July 2021 to 8 January 2022
 Longest winning run  (All comps):
 13 matches, from 12 February 2022 to 2 May 2022
 Longest winning run (League):
 14 matches, from 12 February 2022 to 6 September 2022
 Longest scoring run (All comps): 
 25 matches, from 8 January 2022 to 6 September 2022
 Most consecutive clean sheets (League):
 5 matches, from 10 December 2022 to present

Player records 
 Most appearances (All comps):
 75 –  Laurent Mendy, 31 July 2021 – present
 Goals scored (All comps):
 46 –  James Berry, 7 August 2021 – present
 Goals scored in a match: 
 4  –  James Berry v Avro (H), 19 March 2022 – NWCFL Premier Division
 4 –  Tom Clare v Winsford United (A), 3 August 2021 – NWCFL Premier Division

Cup performances
 Best FA Cup performance: 
 Second Qualifying Round, 2022–23
Best FA Trophy performance: 
 First Round, 2022–23
Best FA Vase performance: 
 First Qualifying Round, 2021–22
Best Cheshire Senior Cup performance: 
 Second Round, 2021–22

Notable players 
Macclesfield F.C. players who have attained at least one international cap during their career.
 Alex Bruce
 Neil Danns

See also

Notes

References

External links

Football clubs in Cheshire
Association football clubs established in 1874
1874 establishments in England
Phoenix clubs (association football)
Football clubs in England
Northern Premier League clubs
North West Counties Football League clubs